Bayshore High School is a public high school located in Bradenton, Florida, United States. The high school is part of Manatee County School District and located at 5401 34th Street West.

History
In 2007 Bayshore opened up a pre-college center for incoming freshmen but was sold to Manatee Technical Institute in 2013.

In 1998, A new campus was built south of the original structure. The 1974 building was demolished and the land was converted into a parking lot and football field.

Notable alumni 

 Rob McKittrick, filmmaker

References

External links
Official school website

High schools in Manatee County, Florida
Public high schools in Florida